Michael Garvey (born September 13, 1962) is an American professional stock car racing driver who currently works as a crew chief in the NASCAR Xfinity Series for DGM Racing's No. 90 Chevrolet Camaro. As a driver, he competed in NASCAR and the American Speed Association.

NASCAR career
Garvey has participated in races in the NASCAR Craftsman Truck Series, Busch Series, and NEXTEL Cup since 1993. He has participated in three or less races each year except for the 1994 Busch Series and the 2005 NEXTEL Cup Series driving the No. 66 Ford. His best career NEXTEL Cup finish is a 25th-place finish at the 2005 Pocono Raceway.

During the 2006 season, Garvey made four Nextel Cup starts for Competitive Edge Motorsports owned by Joe Auer. His best finish was 38 twice, at Texas Motor Speedway and California Speedway. The team suddenly shut down in August 2006 due to increased competition and sold its equipment off on eBay and folded.

In 2007, Garvey drove the No. 17 Monte Carlo in the USAR Hooters Pro Cup Southern Division series for WJP Motorsports.

Garvey served as the crew chief for NASCAR Truck Series driver Ryan Sieg in 2010. He has also competed as a teammate to Sieg on several occasions garnering a best finish of 12th at Talladega Superspeedway. Garvey also has been racing for Tracy Goodson Motorsports on his off weekends from the truck series.

Garvey returned to NASCAR in 2022 as the crew chief for DGM Racing's part-time No. 90 car driven by Mason Filippi in the Xfinity Series race at the Indianapolis Motor Speedway road course. Filippi failed to qualify for the race.

Motorsports career results

NASCAR
(key) (Bold – Pole position awarded by qualifying time. Italics – Pole position earned by points standings or practice time. * – Most laps led.)

Sprint Cup Series

Daytona 500

Busch Series

Camping World Truck Series

References

External links
 
 Statistics at cbs.sportsline.com

Living people
1962 births
Sportspeople from Muskegon, Michigan
Racing drivers from Michigan
NASCAR drivers
CARS Tour drivers
American Speed Association drivers
NASCAR crew chiefs